Soham is a Hindi-language 24/7 television channel, owned by Vaidanta Group . The channel is a free-to-air and launched on 26 January 2006. The channel is available across all major cable and DTH platforms as well as online.

References

Hindi-language television channels in India
Television channels and stations established in 2016
Hindi-language television stations
Television channels based in Noida
Religious television channels in India